Haralson County is a county located in the northwestern part of the U.S. state of Georgia. As of the 2020 census, the population was 29,919, up from 28,780 2010. The county seat is Buchanan. The county was created on January 26, 1856, and was named for Hugh A. Haralson, a former Georgia congressman.

Haralson County is part of the Atlanta-Sandy Springs-Roswell, GA metropolitan statistical area.

Geography
Much of the county is located within the upper Piedmont region of the state, with a few mountains in the county that are considered part of the foothills of the Appalachian Mountains.

The vast majority of Haralson County is located in the Upper Tallapoosa River sub-basin of the ACT River Basin (Coosa-Tallapoosa River Basin). Just the very northwestern corner of the county is located in the Upper Coosa River sub-basin of the same ACT River Basin.

Major highways

  Interstate 20
  U.S. Route 27
  U.S. Route 27 Business
  U.S. Route 78
  State Route 1
  State Route 1 Business
  State Route 8
  State Route 16
  State Route 100
  State Route 113
  State Route 120
  State Route 402 (unsigned designation for I-20)

Adjacent counties
 Polk County - north
 Paulding County - northeast
 Carroll County - south
 Cleburne County, Alabama - west (CST)

Demographics

2010 census
As of the 2010 U.S. census, there were 28,780 people, 10,757 households, and 7,820 families living in the county. The racial makeup of the county was 92.8% white, 4.7% black or African American, 0.5% Asian, 0.2% American Indian, 0.4% from other races, and 1.4% from two or more races. Those of Hispanic or Latino origin made up 1.1% of the population. In terms of ancestry, 37.1% were American, 14.1% were Irish, 11.1% were English, and 6.0% were German.

Of the 10,757 households, 36.6% had children under the age of 18 living with them, 53.8% were married couples living together, 13.3% had a female householder with no husband present, 27.3% were non-families, and 23.2% of all households were made up of individuals. The average household size was 2.64 and the average family size was 3.09. The median age was 38.5 years.

The median income for a household in the county was $38,996 and the median income for a family was $45,339. Males had a median income of $39,452 versus $32,170 for females. The per capita income for the county was $19,033. About 15.6% of families and 20.4% of the population were below the poverty line, including 28.8% of those under age 18 and 16.4% of those age 65 or over.

2020 census

As of the 2020 United States census, there were 29,919 people, 11,259 households, and 7,960 families residing in the county.

Education
Public education in the county is largely provided by the Haralson County School District. However, the City of Bremen, which straddles the border of Haralson and Carroll Counties, operates the independent Bremen City School District.

Communities
 Besma
 Bremen
 Buchanan (county seat)
 Budapest
 Draketown
 Felton
 Tallapoosa
 Waco

Law and government
The county was originally governed by a sole Commissioner of Roads and Revenues. The last occupant of this office was Charles Sanders (D). The county is now governed by a five-member Board of Commissioners, which replaced the single-commissioner form beginning with the term starting in January 2005. The Chairman of the Board is elected county-wide. The acting occupant of this office is Ronnie Ridley (R). There are four other commissioners, one elected from each of four geographical districts. The current occupants of these offices are District 1's David Tarply (R), District 2's Jamie Brown (R), District 3's John Daniel (R) and District 4's Ryan Farmer (R). The current sheriff of Haralson County is Stacy Williams.  Judge J. Edward "Eddie" Hulsey Jr. is the current probate judge.

See also

 National Register of Historic Places listings in Haralson County, Georgia
List of counties in Georgia

References

External links
 Haralson County Historical Society
 Haralson County Chamber of Commerce
 Haralson County Development Authority
 Haralson County historical marker

 
1856 establishments in Georgia (U.S. state)
Haralson
Counties of Appalachia
Georgia (U.S. state) counties
Northwest Georgia (U.S.)
Populated places established in 1856